Xolisile "Xoli" Zondi (born 17 September 1983), also known as Xoli Zondi-Zamisa, is a South African actress and model. She is best known for the roles in the television serials Family Bonds, Generations and Single Galz.

Personal life
Zondi was born on 17 September 1983 in Hammersdale, South Africa. She completed a diploma in drama studies from the Durban University of Technology in 2003.

She has one daughter named Mandy from a relationship at very young age, where she got pregnant at the age of 16. She is married to Phiwokuhle Zamisa, a ward councilor, where the wedding was celebrated on 2 December 2017. The couple has one daughter, Ukusa Zamisa who was born on 26 October 2018.

Career
In 2004, he started acting in theatre dramas. In 2006, she joined with the SABC1 sitcom Family Bonds and played the role "Winnie". The serial became very popular, where she continued to play the role until 2009. After that, she played the popular role of "Zodwa Mabena" in the SABC1 soap opera Generations from 2010 to 2014. For this role, she was nominated for the Outstanding Supporting Actress Award at the 2013 Royalty Soapie Awards. In 2013, she appeared in the sixth episode "Hamba Voetsek" of the season 5 of e.tv anthology serial eKasi: Our Stories with the role of "Smangele". In 2014, she starred the role as "Ntsiki", in the SABC1 sitcom Single Galz.

In 2016, she played the supportive role of "Nqobile Gigaba" in the Mzansi Magic’s drama series, Greed and Desire. In 2020, she joined with e.tv drama serial, Imbewu with the mentally ill character "Violet".

Filmography

2022.    Imbewu.                   Violet.              TV Series

References

External links
 IMDb

Living people
South African film actresses
South African television actresses
South African stage actresses
1983 births